Huambo is a town in southern Peru, capital of the district Huambo in the province Caylloma in the Arequipa region.

External links
 www.huambo-colca.com

Populated places in the Arequipa Region